Ian Smith (born 7 December 1965) is a former Super League referee. He was one of the Full Time Match Officials' coaches.

Background
Smith was born in Oldham, Lancashire, England.

Domestic career
Smith officiated in the Super League competition.

His first pro game was Blackpool v Bramley in 1998.
His first Super League game was the London Broncos versus the Salford City Reds on 7 August 1999.

Super League
In 2008, Ian Smith famously sent off Gareth Hock for manhandling him. Hock was suspended 5 matches and missed the rest of 2008's Super League XIII season.

Co-operative Championship
He was Co-operative Championship's referee of the year in 1999 & 2000.

International career 
 Ian Smith was the video referee for England VS France on 24 October 2009 in the 4 Nations.
 He is the video referee for Scotland VS Lebanon on 1 November 2009 in the Rugby League European Cup.
 He is the video referee for France VS Australia on 7 November 2009 in the 4 Nations.

References

External links
 Ian Smith on the RFL
 Manhandling incident
 Ian Smith Stats

1965 births
Living people
English rugby league referees
Sportspeople from Oldham